B37 may refer to:
 HLA-B37, an HLA-B serotype
 Bundesstraße 37, a German road
 ATN1, a human protein alternately known as B37
 Alexandrina Road in South Australia with the route number "B37"
 Lockheed B-37, a Lockheed Ventura aircraft
 Soviet submarine B-37, a Project 641 or Foxtrot-class diesel submarine of the Soviet Navy's Northern Fleet
 Soviet gun B-37, caliber 406 mm. (:ru:406-мм морская пушка Б-37)
BMW B37, a three-cylinder turbo diesel engine designed by BMW